Hsu Ru-yun (born Hsu Hung-hsiu on September 20, 1974), better known as Valen Hsu, is a Taiwanese pop singer-songwriter, author and occasional actress. Since the mid-1990s Hsu has been one of the most popular female singers in the Mandopop scene, and is best known for her love ballads.

Biography
A classically trained pianist, she started playing the piano when she was 4. While she was attending high school in 1993, she was discovered while performing in a restaurant in Taipei, where many known pop artists began their careers. She was offered a contract with Taiwan's What's Music Record label and began work on her first commercial album, all before the age of 19.

Career
Valen Hsu is known for her vocals, which are wispy yet strong and crystal-clear. Her singing voice and technique have been compared to Hong Kong's Faye Wong. In 1998, the Japanese magazine publication Asia Pop voted her as the best female pop vocalist in Asia. She has been known to deliver CD-quality live performances. Occasionally, she will play the piano while singing live at her concerts.

Career peak (1995–2000)
Valen Hsu has recorded 14 studio albums over the span of eight years, as well as four "Best Of" compilations. Her first album, Tau Hao, was completed in 1994 and received critical acclaim from the Asian music industry. However, record sales did not exceed expectations, only selling a little over 50,000 copies. Her next studio album was what significantly changed her career. Lei Hai, or Tear Sea as translated, sold more than 300,000 copies in Taiwan. And her third album, If the Cloud Knows, sold over 2.2 million copies alone in Taiwan. Her fourth album, Ri Guang Ji Chang (Sunlight Airport) was completed in 1998 and sold 800,000 copies in Taiwan, but over 3 million copies in Asia, permanently placing her in the company of Asian divas such as Faye Wong and Sandy Lam and becoming an integral part of a new Mando-Pop era including Coco Lee and A-Mei.

In 1999, after the sale of What's Music to Universal Records (Taiwan), she recorded a duet with Enrique Iglesias entitled You’re My No. 1, released on Enrique's Asian version of his Enrique album.

Career stabilise (2001–2004)
She ended her contract with What's Music in 2001 and signed on with EMI Taiwan. The first album with her new record label was titled I Just Want to Tell You, and it was produced by Yosinori Kameda, a famous Japanese music producer. In 2001, she decided to broaden her professional career by acting in her first TV drama with F4, Taiwan's boy-band equivalent to 'N Sync. She further broadened her acting career in 2003 by performing on stage with Zuni Icosahedron, an independent cultural collective concentrating on alternative theater and multi-media performances. In 2004, she decided to take a hiatus from the music industry to pursue other interests, including learning English in New York City.

Back from hiatus (2007–2010)
Her 13th studio album entitled 66° Pohjoista Leveyttä was released on December 21, 2007. She traveled to Finland's Arctic Circle to film her music videos for this new album. Filming took place mainly in two cities: Helsinki and Rovaniemi. The first single is called "Fireworks". She recorded a duet with Amguulan, a very talented singer from Inner Mongolia, "Man and Woman" became one of the most popular song throughout 2008.

After a 19 months hiatus, Valen released her latest album My Love Journey 1 km. She invited her friend Josh to co-produced this album with her. Her first single is called 'Let's go when love arrives', 2nd song is a soft rock 'With You'.

Valen voice production, world tour (2010–present)
In 2009, Valen ended her contract with Seed Music and decided to travel to Cuba. After returning from Cuba, she released a series of travelogues and photography books. In 2010, Valen decide to re-ignite her music career by setting up her own music studio, Valen Voice Production. Her new album When The Night Falls... Do You Hear (Me)? was released on November 10, 2011.

In October 2011, Valen announced the start of her concert in Shanghai Grand Stage, which will span from Taiwan, other cities in mainland China and South-east Asia.

In August 2015, Valen entered The Chinese version of King of Mask Singer (蒙面歌王), using the mask of Iron Fan Ultraman to conceal her identity. She was crowned the Mask King of the fourth episode.

Other works

Acting
In 2006, she filmed a full-length movie with Hong Kong director Patrick Tam entitled Fu Zi, or After This Our Exile as translated. She stars alongside Hong Kong actors Aaron Kwok and Charlie Yeung. The film was released in 2006 and subsequently won several Golden Horse Awards (Asia's equivalent to the Academy Awards) in the same year, including Best Picture and Best Actor.

Writing
In addition to composing and writing some of her songs, she has also published two books, one of them a compilation of short poems and the other a beauty book entitled Beauty Sense, which were published in 2003 and 2006, respectively.

In 2010, she published a travelogue, Vis-à-Vis, which comprises short poems and photos shot in Cuba. A digital version on iPad was released in 2011.

Charity work
In 1999, she traveled to Rwanda, Africa with the World Health Organization and other Asian celebrities to perform charity work, filming a commercial and raising funds for donation through sales of an E.P. entitled Wo Niu (which means "Snail"), written by Jay Chou, one of Asia's male mega pop stars.

Hope Education Foundation
In 2006, Valen and her friends, Charlie Yeung, Gigi Leung and Angelica Lee formed "Hope Education Foundation", which is a non-profit organization to help children in need.

Discography

Studio albums

Compilations

Instrumental

EP/Singles

Musical theatre performances
 2003 – Good Wind Like Water (好風如水)(Zuni Icosahedron)
 2005 – Fragments d’un Discours Amoureux (戀人絮語) (Yi Hua Lin Productions)
 2010 – Turn Left, Turn Right (幾米 / 向左走向右走) (Based on the book A Chance of Sunshine by Jimmy Liao)

Film and television
 2002 – Come to My Place (來我家吧) – Director : Cheng Ze Niou (Cast : Valen Hsu, F4)
 2005 – After This Our Exile (父子) – Director : Patrick Tam （Cast : Aaron Kwok, Charlie Yeung, Valen Hsu）

Books
 2003 – The cost of happiness at this point in time (此時快樂的代價), A collection of short poems
 2006 – Beauty Sense (五感美人), A book on beauty and wellness tips
 2008 – Fragile (小心輕放), 2nd book of collection of short poems
 2009 – I Want to be Your Friend (我想要和你做朋友), A book for Hope Foundation
 2010 – Vis-à-Vis (對照),Collections of short poems and photos shot in Cuba
 2011 – Vis-à-Vis (對照) iPad version, Collections of short poems and photos shot in Cuba

Endorsements and charities
 1996 – Esprit Clothing Spokesperson
 1998 – AB Call Pager Service
 1998 – ICRT Charity Concert
 1999 – Head & Shoulders Shampoo Commercial – Part 1 (Taiwan, Singapore & Hong Kong) (E.P.：All Your Heart）
 1999 – WHO Charity Run — Rwanda（E.P. : Gua Niou）
 1999 – Head & Shoulders Shampoo Commercial – Part 2 (Taiwan, Singapore & Hong Kong) (E.P. : I’m This Happy）
 1999 – Cable & Wireless (Hong Kong Telecom)
 2002 – Tai Ping Soda Crackers Commercial [China & Hong Kong]
 2002 – O Smile Biscuits Commercial [Taiwan]
 2003 – Mei Bei Jia Shampoo Commercial [China]
 2006 – Chantecaille Spokesperson
 2006 – Rice Beauty Products Commercial & Spokesperson

References

External links
 Valen's Official Website http://www.valenvoice.com/
 Valen's Facebook http://www.facebook.com/pages/xu-ru-yun-Valen-Hsu/239712411490
 Valen's Blog in Taiwan http://valenhsu.pixnet.net/blog
 Valen's Blog in China http://blog.sina.com.cn/u/1244876825
 Valen's WeiBo in China http://t.sina.com.cn/xuruyun
 Valen's Plurk http://www.plurk.com/ValenH
 Taiwan Fans Club http://blog.pixnet.net/JustForValen
 China Fans Club http://www.xuruyun.net/
 Korea Fans Club http://valenf.com.ne.kr/
 Hope Education Foundation https://web.archive.org/web/20090310044931/http://www.hope-ef.org/eng/support.html

1974 births
Living people
Musicians from Taipei
Pop pianists
Taiwanese stage actresses
Taiwanese composers
Taiwanese Mandopop singer-songwriters
21st-century Taiwanese actresses
20th-century Taiwanese women singers
21st-century Taiwanese women singers
21st-century pianists
20th-century women pianists
21st-century women pianists
Cantonese-language singers of Taiwan